Center Township is a township in Shelby County, Iowa. Center Township has a population of 468 and an area of 22.8 square miles.

References

Townships in Shelby County, Iowa
Townships in Iowa